T.A.Z.: The Temporary Autonomous Zone is a book by the anarchist writer and poet Hakim Bey (Peter Lamborn Wilson) published in 1991 by Autonomedia and in 2011 by Pacific Publishing Studio. It is composed of three sections, "Chaos: The Broadsheets of Ontological Anarchism", "Communiques of the Association for Ontological Anarchy" and "The Temporary Autonomous Zone".

Themes
The book describes the socio-political tactic of creating temporary spaces that elude formal structures of control. The essay uses various examples from history and philosophy, all of which suggest that the best way to create a non-hierarchical system of social relationships is to concentrate on the present and on releasing one's own mind from the controlling mechanisms that have been imposed on it.

In the formation of a temporary autonomous zone, Bey argues, information becomes a key tool that sneaks into the cracks of formal procedures. A new territory of the moment is created that is on the boundary line of established regions. Any attempt at permanence that goes beyond the moment deteriorates to a structured system that inevitably stifles individual creativity. It is this chance at creativity that is real empowerment.

Bey later expanded the concept beyond the "temporary", saying, "We've had to consider the fact that not all existing autonomous zones are 'temporary.' Some are ... more-or-less 'permanent.'" Hence, the concept of the permanent autonomous zone.

The titular section is divided up into the following subsections:
 Pirate Utopias
 Waiting for the Revolution
 The Psychotopology of Everyday Life
 The Net and the Web
 "Gone to Croatan"
 Music as an Organizational Principle
 The Will To Power as Disappearance
 Ratholes in the Babylon of Information

The ideas which inspired the "Gone to Croatan" chapter — i.e. the disappearance of the Roanoke Colony — were later used as the basis for the book Gone To Croatan: The Origins of North American Dropout Culture, edited by Ron Sakolsky and James Koehnline.

See also 
 List of books about anarchism

References

External links
Full text of T.A.Z.
T.A.Z.: The Temporary Autonomous Zone free audio version at Archive.org

Anarchist communities
Post-left anarchism
1985 non-fiction books
Books about anarchism